Donald Frederick Sandys Wunsch  (16 January 1887 – 23 August 1973) was a notable New Zealand chemical engineer and factory manager. He was born in Manchester, England, in 1887.

In the 1957 New Year Honours, he was appointed an Officer of the Order of the British Empire, in recognition of his role as chairman of the Advisory Council of Scientific and Industrial Research.

In 2010, IChemE in New Zealand instituted the annual Kennedy-Wunsch lecture, in recognition of the pioneering roles that both Wunsch and Miles Kennedy played in the development of chemical engineering in New Zealand.

References

1887 births
1973 deaths
New Zealand chemists
English emigrants to New Zealand
20th-century New Zealand businesspeople
New Zealand chemical engineers
New Zealand Officers of the Order of the British Empire
Engineers from Manchester